Vettom is a local body of the Kerala government and village in Tirur Taluk, Malappuram district, India. It is the coastal suburb of Tirur Municipality. It was part of the Kingdom of Tanur (Vettathnad) in medieval times. Vettom gram panjayath is surrounded by water on all borders. Those are Tirur River and canoli canal.

Demographics
, Vettom had a population of 334,300 with 16,661 males and 17,769 females.

Transportation
Vettom village connects to other parts of India through Tirur town.  National highway No.66 passes through Tirur and the northern stretch connects to Goa and Mumbai.  The southern stretch connects to Cochin and Trivandrum.   Highway No.966 goes to Palakkad and Coimbatore.   The nearest airport is at Kozhikode.  The nearest major railway station is at Tirur.

Wards of Vettom
{ "type": "ExternalData",  "service": "geoshape",  "ids": "Q16137665"}
Vettom Grama Panchayat is composed of the following 20 wards:

See also
Pachattiri
Niramarutur
Mangalam
Tirur

References

Villages in Malappuram district
Populated coastal places in India
Tirur area